Dèbora e Jaéle (Deborah and Jael) is an opera in three acts composed by Ildebrando Pizzetti who also wrote the libretto. The libretto is based on the story of Deborah and Jael from the Book of Judges in the Bible. However, it differs in several ways from the traditional Biblical account, primarily in the motivations of its characters and the relationships between them. The opera was first performed at La Scala, Milan on 16 December 1922.

Pizzetti described Dèbora e Jaéle as "The first opera that is truly all my own", distancing himself from the poet Gabriele D'Annunzio whose work had a significant influence on Pizzetti's early career.

Roles

Synopsis

Act 1
The Israelite prophetess Deborah preaches war against the Canaanite king Sisera. Sisera is hiding within the walls of an impregnable fortress. Knowing the king is in love with Jael, she sends the latter, accompanied by Mara, to lure him out.

Act 2
Jael is brought into the king's presence and attempts to kill him. But she falls in love with Sisera and he pardons her. Mara sings of the son she has lost at the hands of the Canaanites and stirs Jael's conscience. Sisera allows Jael to leave the fortress, promising to meet her again after he has defeated the Israelites.

Act 3
The Israelites defeat the Canaanites in battle and Sisera seeks refuge in Jael's tent. Deborah demands that he be handed over but Jael refuses. But, as an Israelite mob approaches, Jael kills Sisera in his sleep to save him from a worse death.

References

External links
Complete piano/vocal score published by Ricordi in 1922

Operas by Ildebrando Pizzetti
Italian-language operas
1922 operas
Operas
Operas based on the Bible
Opera world premieres at La Scala